Monica Maria Raymund (born July 26, 1986) is an American actress, known for her roles as Maria "Ria" Torres in the Fox crime drama Lie to Me (2009–2011), Dana Lodge in the CBS legal drama The Good Wife (2011–2012), Gabriela Dawson in the NBC drama Chicago Fire (2012–2019) and Jackie Quińones in the Starz crime drama Hightown (2020–present).

Early life and education
Raymund was born in St. Petersburg, Florida, to Steve Raymund, the board chairman and retired CEO of Tech Data Corp., a Clearwater-based distributor of computer components and software, and Sonia (née Lara), a community volunteer and co-founder of the Soulful Arts Dance Academy in St. Petersburg.  Her father is of German and Eastern European Jewish descent. Her mother is Dominican. Raymund was raised Jewish, celebrated a bat mitzvah and attended a Reform Judaism temple. Her paternal grandfather was businessman and philanthropist Edward C. Raymund. Raymund's younger brother, Will, was a graduate of Berklee College of Music, and a sound and lighting engineer and music promoter. He died in August 2015. 

In high school, she participated in the "Broadway Theater Project" in Tampa and was a founding member of The Performing Arts Project at the University of North Carolina School of the Arts in Winston-Salem."

Raymund graduated from Shorecrest Preparatory School in St. Petersburg, Florida, in 2004, and from the Juilliard School in New York City in 2008.

Career
Reportedly, Raymund performed in Cymbeline directed by Richard Feldman, The Diviners (directed by Jonathan Bernstein), and Animal Farm (directed by Trazana Beverley) all at the Juilliard School.

Raymund also appeared in her native St. Petersburg, Florida, in the LiveArts Peninsula Foundation's original production of Manhattan Casino (directed by Bob Devin Jones) where she originated the leading role of Althea Dunbar and Webb's City: The Musical (music & lyrics by Lee Ahlin, written and directed by William Leavengood)." Raymund "is a three-year alumna of Ann Reinking's Broadway Theater Project, where she has been a featured performer."

Raymund has also "worked with playwright José Rivera on Boleros for the Disenchanted at the Huntington Theatre Company in Boston" in 2008. In April 2008, she appeared the NBC legal drama Law & Order: Special Victims Unit, in season 9 episode 17 titled "Authority" in the opening scene as a strip search prank call victim. From 2009 to 2011, she starred in the Fox crime drama Lie to Me, where she played Maria "Ria" Torres, a human lie detector who is a "natural", meaning she has no formal training in detecting lies or the emotions of others. She was using crutches because of a knee injury when she auditioned for this role.

From 2011 until 2012, Raymund had a recurring role in the third season of the CBS legal drama The Good Wife, where she played Dana Lodge, an assistant states attorney.

In 2012, Raymund began starring in the NBC drama Chicago Fire. She played Gabriela Dawson, the paramedic in charge and a firefighter candidate. On May 15, 2018, Raymund confirmed that she was leaving the show after six seasons. She briefly appeared on the show in the seventh-season premiere "A Closer Eye". In November 2019, she returned to the show in the eighth-season episode "Best Friend Magic".

In 2020, Raymund began starring as Jackie Quiñones in the Starz crime drama Hightown.

Raymund has also directed several episodes of television, an episode of Law & Order: Special Victims Unit, an episode of Dick Wolf's FBI, and an episode of Chicago P.D.

Personal life
On June 11, 2011, Raymund married writer Neil Patrick Stewart. They separated in early 2013 and divorced in 2014.

Raymund is an ardent supporter of LGBT rights. In February 2014, she came out publicly as bisexual for the first time via Twitter. On September 16, 2015, Raymund announced via Twitter that she had begun dating camerawoman, cinematographer and producer Tari Segal.

Filmography

Film

Television

References

External links
 
 "St. Petersburg native, 'Lie To Me' co-star Monica Raymund ready to put in the work". St Petersburg Times, January 25, 2009 – Interview with Raymund

1986 births
Actresses from Florida
American musical theatre actresses
American people of Dominican Republic descent
American people of German descent
American television actresses
Bisexual actresses
Bisexual women
Hispanic and Latino American actresses
Jewish American actresses
Juilliard School alumni
Living people
LGBT Jews
LGBT people from Florida
People from St. Petersburg, Florida
21st-century American actresses
LGBT Hispanic and Latino American people
21st-century American Jews
American bisexual actors